The Qäwrighul culture is a late Bronze Age culture which flourished along the Kongque River in Xinjiang from ca. 2100 BC to 1500 BC.

Characteristics
The Qäwrighul culture is primarily known for its cemeteries. The best attested of these are the cemeteries of Qäwrighul itself, in which at least forty-two burials have been uncovered. Qäwrighul tombs are divided into two types. 

The first type of Qäwrighul tomb is characterized by shaft graves. These included evidence of wooden planking. Sometimes, wooden poles were erected on the western and eastern ends of the chamber. The deceased in these tombs were buried in an extended position with their heads to the east. They bore felt hats and were wrapped in woolen fabrics. On their chests, twigs of ephedra have been discovered. Grave goods in these tombs include bone ornaments, antler awls, wooden basins, stone implements, and bowls. Although traces of metal, both copper and bronze, have been discovered, no evidence of ceramics have been found. The physical type of these burials have been connected those of the earlier Afanasievo culture.

The second type of Qäwrighul was characterised by shaft graves surrounded by concentric circles of poles. Other poles radiate out to form what appears to be solar symbols. The burials are exclusively confined to males. The forms of pole circles have been compared to the stone circles characteristic of the Andronovo culture. The physical type of these burials are also similar to those of the Andronovo culture.

The differences of the two types of Qäwrighul burial has been variously interpreted. Some have explained them as belonging to people with different status belonging to the same culture, while others have explained them as belonging chronologically separate cultures belonging to different populations.

The preservation of the bodies range from poor to incredible well preserved mummies. Which is a result of the arid sandy conditions of the area.

From the limited remains of the Qäwrighul culture it appears that their economy included wheat, sheep, goat and horses. Deer and fish have also been discovered.

The burials of the Qäwrighul culture are Europoid. These are the earliest evidence for the presence of Europoid populations in the Tarim Basin. Its burials in shaft-graves, lined with stone or timber, and surrounded by enclosures, and the presence of offering-places associated with the heads and legs of horses, are strikingly similar to the graves of cultures located further west on the Eurasian Steppe. The physical type of the Qäwrighul people is similar to that of people of the earlier Afanasievo culture, and people of the contemporary Andronovo culture. On this basis, the Qäwrighul culture has been considered a possible candidate as an ancestor of the Tocharians.

See also

 Chust culture
 Yaz culture
 Vakhsh culture
 Bishkent culture
 Tazabagyab culture
 Swat culture

References

Sources

Further reading
 
 

Bronze Age cultures of Asia
Bronze Age in China